The Music Behind the Magic: The Musical Artistry of Alan Menken, Howard Ashman & Tim Rice is a four-disc box set highlighting the creative evolution behind the music of Disney's The Little Mermaid, Beauty and the Beast and Aladdin. Released on November 22, 1994 on Walt Disney Records, the set includes work tape recordings, demos, previously released final recordings, and unreleased master recordings of songs and score cues.

Track listing

See also
The Little Mermaid soundtrack
Beauty and the Beast soundtrack
Aladdin soundtrack
Walt Disney Records the Legacy Collection
Disney Records

References

1994 compilation albums
Walt Disney Records compilation albums
Soundtrack compilation albums
Pop soundtracks
1994 soundtrack albums
Pop compilation albums
Musical film soundtracks
Fantasy film soundtracks